Ioannis Chadjivasilis (born 26 April 1990) is a Cypriot footballer who plays for AEZ Zakakiou in the Cypriot Second Division as a forward and second striker. He is highly regarded for his dribbling skills.

Honors
Cypriot Cup: 2012
Cypriot Second Division : 2012-13

External links
 

1990 births
Living people
People from Paphos
Cypriot footballers
Cyprus under-21 international footballers
AEP Paphos FC players
Atromitos Yeroskipou players
AC Omonia players
Aris Limassol FC players
Ethnikos Achna FC players
Apollon Limassol FC players
Cypriot First Division players
Association football forwards
Doxa Katokopias FC players